House on Wagstaff Farm is a historic home located near Roxboro, Person County, North Carolina.  It is dated to the early-19th century, and is a -story, single-pile, frame dwelling.  The interior has a hall-parlor plan and transitional Georgian / Federal style detailing. It has a side gable roof and stone and brick gable end chimneys.

The house was added to the National Register of Historic Places in 2005.

References

Houses on the National Register of Historic Places in North Carolina
Federal architecture in North Carolina
Georgian architecture in North Carolina
Houses in Person County, North Carolina
National Register of Historic Places in Person County, North Carolina